Alfred Clement Jackson (1886 – 28 August 1960) was an English professional footballer who made 184 appearances in the Football League playing for Lincoln City. He played as a right back.

Life and career
Jackson was born in Kimberley, Nottinghamshire, and played football for local clubs Kimberley St John's and Eastwood Rangers before joining Lincoln City. He made his debut in January 1909, and contributed to Lincoln becoming champions of the Midland League and consequent re-election to the Football League. He played regularly from then on, making more than 30 appearances each season until the First World War put a stop to league football in 1915. He played 15 games in the first post-war season, his last appearances in Lincoln's first team.

Jackson died in 1960 aged about 74.

References

1886 births
1960 deaths
People from Kimberley, Nottinghamshire
Footballers from Nottinghamshire
English footballers
Association football fullbacks
Kimberley St John's F.C. players
Eastwood Rangers F.C. players
Lincoln City F.C. players
Midland Football League players
English Football League players